Mall of Joy is a shopping mall located in Thrissur, Kerala, India. It is the first of eight malls proposed by Joy Alukkas Group, with the one at Kottayam being second to start functioning.

See also
 Sobha City Mall

References

Shopping malls in Thrissur
2014 establishments in Kerala
Shopping malls established in 2014